Shangwanlu station is an interchange station between Line 9 and Line 10 of Chongqing Rail Transit in Chongqing municipality, China. It is located in Yubei District and opened in 2017.

Station structure
There are 2 island platforms at this station. The two outer tracks are used for Line 9 trains, while the other two inner tracks are used for Line 10 trains. A same direction cross-platform interchange is provided between the two metro lines.

References

Railway stations in Chongqing
Railway stations in China opened in 2017
Chongqing Rail Transit stations